Renhe Subdistrict is a subdistrict in Gaotang County, Liaocheng, Shandong, China. , it administers the following five residential neighborhoods and four villages:
Quanlin Community
Jinxing Community
Kangle Community
Yucai Community
Jincheng Community
Hexing Village
Shengshi Village
Heping Village
He'an Village

See also 
 List of township-level divisions of Shandong

References 

Township-level divisions of Shandong
Gaotang County